The women's shot put event at the 2020 Summer Olympics is scheduled to take place on 30 July and 1 August 2021 at the Japan National Stadium. Approximately 35 athletes are expected to compete; the exact number will depend on how many nations use universality places to enter athletes in addition to the 32 qualifying through distance or ranking (2 universality places were used in 2016).

Summary

On the first throw of the final Raven Saunders dropped a 19.65m, which proved sufficient to nail down silver. As the fifth thrower, Gong Lijao's 19.95m would prove to be better than anyone else could muster. The only other thrower over 19 metres in the first round was Auriol Dongmo with 19.29m. In the second round, two time Olympic Champion, in her fifth Olympics, Valerie Adams tossed 19.49m to move into third and the medal order had been decided. Adams threw her best in the third round with a 19.62m, followed shortly by Gong improving to 19.98m. In the fourth round, Dongmo made her best effort 19.57m, but not enough to pass Adams. In the fifth round, Saunders threw her best 19.79m, but on the next throw, Gong hit 20.53 to extend her lead. Saunders made one more effort in the final round, her shot landing well beyond the 20 meter tape shortly after her foot landed over the toe board making it a foul. Relaxed as the winner, Gong followed with her best effort,  to take gold.

Background

This will be the 19th appearance of the event, having appeared at every Summer Olympics since 1948.

Qualification

A National Olympic Committee (NOC) could enter up to 3 qualified athletes in the women's shot put event if all athletes meet the entry standard or qualify by ranking during the qualifying period. (The limit of 3 has been in place since the 1930 Olympic Congress.) The qualifying standard is 18.50 metres. This standard was "set for the sole purpose of qualifying athletes with exceptional performances unable to qualify through the IAAF World Rankings pathway." The world rankings, based on the average of the best five results for the athlete over the qualifying period and weighted by the importance of the meet, will then be used to qualify athletes until the cap of 32 is reached.

The qualifying period was originally from 1 May 2019 to 29 June 2020. Due to the COVID-19 pandemic, the period was suspended from 6 April 2020 to 30 November 2020, with the end date extended to 29 June 2021. The world rankings period start date was also changed from 1 May 2019 to 30 June 2020; athletes who had met the qualifying standard during that time were still qualified, but those using world rankings would not be able to count performances during that time. The qualifying time standards could be obtained in various meets during the given period that have the approval of the IAAF. Both outdoor and indoor meets are eligible. The most recent Area Championships may be counted in the ranking, even if not during the qualifying period.

NOCs can also use their universality place—each NOC can enter one female athlete regardless of time if they had no female athletes meeting the entry standard for an athletics event—in the shot put.

Competition format

The 2020 competition will continue to use the two-round format with divided final introduced in 1936. The qualifying round gives each competitor three throws to achieve a qualifying distance (not yet set; 2016 used 18.40 metres); if fewer than 12 women do so, the top 12 will advance. The final provides each thrower with three throws; the top eight throwers receive an additional three throws for a total of six, with the best to count (qualifying round throws are not considered for the final).

Records
Prior to this competition, the existing world, Olympic, and area records are as follows.

Schedule

All times are Japan Standard Time (UTC+9)

The women's shot put will take place over two separate days.

Results

Qualifying 
Qualification Rules: Qualifying performance 18.80 (Q) or at least 12 best performers (q) advance to the Final.

Final

References

Women's shot put
2020
Women's events at the 2020 Summer Olympics
Olympics